Koen De Bouw (born 30 September 1964 in Turnhout) is a Belgian actor.

He trained to be an actor at Studio Herman Teirlinck in Antwerp and made his breakthrough in Belgium with his role of serial killer Stef Tavernier in the TV-series Wittekerke. He played the role from 1995 until 1996.

In 2003 he was the protagonist in the thriller The Alzheimer Case. In 2005 De Bouw played the main character in movies as De Indringer en Verlengd weekend. That summer he went to Cuba for three months to make Koning van de wereld. From January 2006 on the actor worked at the movies Stormforce and Dossier K., the successor of The Alzheimer Case. In 2008 he appeared in the original version of the movie Loft (with a script written by Bart De Pauw and Erik Van Looy). During the same period he appeared in Germany in Love Hurts and  directed by Peter Keglevic,

Koen De Bouw is also active in the theatre. He regularly made shows with Jan Decorte (Amlett, In het kreupelhout and O Death) in Het Toneelhuis. In the Raamtheater he could be seen in the play Trojaanse Vrouwen and later also Una Giornata Particolare (after the movie of the same name), in which he played a tormented homosexual under the fascist regime of Mussolini.

Apart from acting, De Bouw has also presented the gardening programme Groene Vingers on vtm from 2007 till 2011.

Filmography 

The Man Who Sold His Skin (2020)
 (2016) - Michel de Vreese (the premier) 
Torpedo (2019 film) - Stan
Het vonnis (2013) - Luc Segers
Brasserie Romantiek (2012) - Frank
Groenten uit Balen (2011) - Mijnheer Verheyen
Smoorverliefd (2010) - Bert
Terug naar de kust (2009) Harry
Dossier K. (2009) - Eric Vincke
Loft (2008) - Chris Van Outryve
Vermist (2007) - Walter Sibelius
Stormforce (2006) - Mark Van Houte
Verlengd weekend (2005) - Christian Van den Heuvel
De Indringer (2005) - Tom Vansant
Knokke Boulevard (2005, short film)
Love Hurts (2004, TV) - Klaus
The Alzheimer Case (2003) - Eric Vincke
Science Fiction (2002) - Rick Decker
Bella Bettien (2002) - Velibor
Vallen (2001) - Benoit
Lijmen/Het Been (2000) - Frans Laarmans
 (2000) - Phil
Shades (1999) - Bob
Left Luggage (1998) - Father Chaya (at age of 20)
Straffe koffie (1997, short film)
Minder dood dan de anderen (1992) - Broer
Eline Vere (1991) - Paul van Raat
Yuppies (1991, short film)
Han de Wit (1990) - Han de Wit
Caught (1986, short film)

TV series
Grenslanders (2019)
The Last Tycoon (2016)
The Team (2015)
Professor T. (2015-2018)
Deadline 25/5 (2014) -
Vermist (2008–2010, 2014) - Walter Sibelius
Salamander (2012–2013) - Klaus
Los Zand (2009) - Willem
Koning van de wereld
Sedes & Belli (2002–2003) - Frank Sedes
Stille Waters (2001–2002) - Rob
Engeltjes (1999)
Windkracht 10 (1998) - Mark Van Houte
De Jacques Vermeire show (1998)
Thuis (1996–1997) - Lou Swertvaeghers
Wittekerke (1995–1996) - Stef Tavernier
Ons geluk (1995)
Moeder, waarom leven wij? (1993)

Guest roles 
Rupel - Peter Huybrechts (Season 1 ep. 13 & 18)
Baantjer - Francesco Fiorini (Season 7 ep. 7)
Recht op Recht - Dennis Moerman (Season 3 ep. 1)
Flikken - Erik Francken (Season 1 ep. 3 & 4 & 7 & 10)
Windkracht 10 - lieutenant SIE (1st series, ep. 5)
Deman - Mario Tytgat (ep. Duivelse minnaars)
F.C. De Kampioenen - Wouter Smeets (Season 2 ep. 6)
Langs de kade - Dokter (Season 1 ep. 6)
Witse - Dirk Nuyens (Season 5 ep. 9), Peter Claessens (Season 8 ep. 12–13)
Aspe - Maarten Box (Season 3 ep. 2)
Heterdaad - Kurt Van Campenhout (Season 4 ep. 9–10)
 Bullets (2018) – "Oligarch" (2 episodes)

Theatre
Una giornata particolare (2006–2008)
Trojaanse vrouwen (2005–2007)
De wet van engel (2003–2006)
O Death (2003–2004)
Poes, poes, poes (1, 2, 3, 4, 5) (2002–2004)
Amlett/Hamlet (2000–2002)
Marieslijk (1999–2000)
3 Koningen (1993–1994)

References

External links 

Koen De Bouw, Website of the Vlaams Theater Instituut, 31 December 2013

1964 births
Living people
Flemish male television actors
Flemish male film actors
Flemish male stage actors
People from Turnhout